Divo is a city in southern Ivory Coast. It is a sub-prefecture of and the seat of Divo Department. It is also the seat of Lôh-Djiboua Region in Gôh-Djiboua District and a commune. In the 2014 census, the city had a population of 105,397, making Divo the ninth-most populous city in the country.

The city is served by Divo Airport.

History 
Divo was the seat of the Sud-Bandama region from 1997 to 2011.

References

Sub-prefectures of Lôh-Djiboua
Communes of Lôh-Djiboua
Regional capitals of Ivory Coast